The 1965 Cal State Los Angeles Diablos football team represented California State College at Los Angeles—now known as California State University, Los Angeles—as a member of the California Collegiate Athletic Association (CCAA) during the 1965 NCAA College Division football season. Led by Homer Beatty in his third and final season as head coach, Cal State Los Angeles compiled an overall record of 9–1 with a mark of 5–0 in conference play, winning the CCAA title for the third consecutive season. The team outscored its opponents 264 to 97 for the season. 
At the end of the regular season, Cal State Los Angeles qualified for the Camellia Bowl, which was the Western Regional Final for the NCAA College Division. The Diablos beat UC Santa Barbara in the game, 18–10. The year-end AP small college football poll had Cal State Los Angeles ranked second. The Diablos played home games at the Rose Bowl in Pasadena, California.

Schedule

Team players in the NFL/AFL
The following Cal State Los Angeles players were selected in the 1966 NFL Draft.

The following Cal State Los Angeles players were selected in the 1966 AFL Draft.

The following finished their Cal State Los Angeles career in 1965, were not drafted, but played in the NFL.

References

Cal State Los Angeles
Cal State Los Angeles Diablos football seasons
California Collegiate Athletic Association football champion seasons
Cal State Los Angeles Diablos football